Forward policy, in the context of Sino-Indian border conflict, was a term coined by the Indian Army to refer to an Indian government directive instructing it to establish "forward" posts (advance posts) to reclaim territory occupied by China. Much before India's decision, China had been carrying out its own version of forward policy by militarising its perceived border and by attacking and apprehending any Indian patrols that ventured into it. Later, China cited India's forward policy as the causus belli that initiated the 1962 Sino-Indian War.

China 
Wendy Palace, a founder member of the Tibet Society at Cambridge University, wrote that China had a forward policy before 1904, but in the following years, China's nature changed to a more western approach. China's forward policy in Tibet on the early-to-mid 1900s brought the Chinese in contact with India. China started pushing is borders further into India and Himalayan states and regions of Ladakh, Uttaranchal, Nepal, Sikkim, Bhutan and Arunachal Pradesh. India's reactionary and defensive forward policy was thus conceptualized; to which China took offensive.

With respect to China's forward policy, the Indian diplomat T. N. Kaul wrote:

India 

Forward policy with respect to India refers to political and military decisions taken in the early 1950s onwards, but it usually specifically refers to the policy adopted in late 1961 in the context of Jawaharlal Nehru, the Sino India border relations and the 1962 war. The forward policy adopted on 2 November 1961 and  has been used to explain and justify the Sino-Indian War, which was launched by China in October 1962. While the Henderson Brooks–Bhagat Report opined that the 1962 war was triggered by India's forward policy, other views occur such as that of Bertil Lintner, who blames events in 1959, specifically the escape of the Dalai Lama from Lhasa, Tibet, to India. Until 1971, Intelligence Bureau Director Mullik positively had advocated the forward policy decision made by Nehru. The Intelligence Bureau had a forward policy in place in 1959. The term "forward policy" was also been used in government documents but was a misnomer or seen in the incorrect context of Indian expansionism. The policy did not imply expansionism but was a defensive policy based on perceived external aggression by pushing back an external aggressor from one's own territory.

Nehru's forward policy was an attempt to break the deadlock that Chinese-Indian relations had reached in 1961. A deadlocked created by events in Tibet causes border clashes, which resulted in fatalities, India's perceived helplessness against Chinese border developments was exacerbated by international and mounting domestic pressure. On 5 December 1961 orders went to the Eastern and Western commands:

The forward policy had Nehru identify a set of strategies designed with the ultimate goal of effectively forcing the Chinese from territory that the Indian government claimed. The doctrine was based on a theory that China would not likely launch an all-out war if India began to occupy territory that China considered to be its own. India's thinking was partly based on the fact that China had many external problems in early 1962, especially with one of the Taiwan Strait Crises. Also, Chinese leaders had insisted they did not wish a war.

Nehru began acting out a policy of establishing new outposts further to the north of the line of control. In June 1962, local Indian commanders had established Dhola Post, in Tawang. The issue was that Dhola Post was one mile north of the McMahon line and was clearly regarded as being in Chinese territory, even by Indian standards. 

General Niranjan Prasad, the commander of the Fourth Division, later wrote, "We at the front knew that since Nehru had said he was going to attack, the Chinese were certainly not going to wait to be attacked".

Nehru's forward policy did not achieve what he had wanted. Contrary to his predictions, China attacked Indian outposts north of the McMahon Line. Thus began the Sino-Indian War, which lasted 30 days as China eventually pushed Indian forces back miles south of the McMahon line. China unilaterally declared a ceasefire with a message that India has entered Chinese territory.

C. Raja Mohan used the phrase "forward policy" in 2003 with respect to India in Afghanistan. The term has also been used in relation to the 2020 China–India skirmishes.

References 

 Bibliography

Sources 
 

Sino-Indian War
China–India relations
Military strategy